Zapotitlán, Jutiapa, Guatemala
 Zapotitlán Municipality, Puebla, Mexico